Alan John Bowkett  (born 6 January 1951 in London) is a British businessman, former Chairman of British company Redrow. He was Chairman of Norwich City football club, from 2009, until he resigned in 2015. Bowkett is also a Non-Executive Chairman of IDH, Europe's largest dental care provider.

He was previously Chief Executive of Boulton & Paul Ltd.

On appointment to his role at Norwich City, he said:
Our task at Norwich City is a simple one - we must start winning football matches. It will be the board's responsibility to ensure that we have the appropriate resources to do that, both human and financial.

Career
Alan Bowkett has been a businessman in England for over 35 years. In 1987, Bowkett undertook his first private equity deal and bought RHP, the ball-bearing company.  for £72.5 million.

Between January 2010 – April 2017, Bowkett was the chairman Avio SpA, an Italy-based leader in space propulsion. Since 2008 he has been a chairman of Strix Ltd., a British electronic controls company with manufacturing in China and Avio SpA is an Italian Aerospace company.

References

English football chairmen and investors
Living people
1951 births
British chairpersons of corporations
British chief executives
Norwich City F.C. non-playing staff